Posavec is a surname, which is derived from the region of Posavina.

It is the third most common surname in Koprivnica-Križevci County and the fourth most common in Varaždin County of Croatia.

Notable people with the surname include:

Josip Posavec (born 1996), Croatian footballer
Mladen Posavec (born 1971), Croatian footballer
Paula Posavec (born 1996), Croatian handball player
Srebrenko Posavec (born 1980), Croatian footballer
Stefanie Posavec (born 1981), American information designer
Stela Posavec (born 1996), Croatian handball player

References

Croatian surnames